Hans Raj Model School (also called HRMS) is a co-educational private school in Punjabi Bagh, New Delhi, India, which provides education to pupils from kindergarten through the 12th grade. The school is located in the suburbs of West Delhi and is spread across 8 acres of green lawns. The kindergarten division is located in a separate 1.5-acre campus designed specifically to cater to the needs of young kids.

In 2009, 2012 and 2016, the school was ranked as one of the trendsetting schools of West Delhi in C-Fore surveys by Hindustan Times.

History
Following along the ideals of the religious and social reformer, Swami Dayanand Saraswati and to impart knowledge in combination with that of the Vedas, the school was founded in the year 1966 by the D.A.V. College Managing Committee in New Delhi. Honouring the principles of Mahatma Hansraj, the school is a part of the 900+ schools and colleges managed by D.A.V. College Managing Committee in India and overseas.

The founder principal of the school was Mr. Tilak Raj Gupta, a renowned educationalist mostly remembered for his innovative scheme of imparting free education to children of various sections of the society in the year 1984 for which he has also conferred the lifetime achievement by the National Progressive Schools’ Conference, India.

Mrs. Heemal Handu Bhat is the current principal of the school.

Vanasthali
Environmental conservation is a part of the school curriculum. A  site adjacent to the school has been converted into a children's forest with a garden of Good-Will International in which students and dignitaries have planted around 4000 trees.

Educational approach
Facilities include computer-aided education, audiovisual aids, multimedia systems, L.C.D Projectors. Internet technologies are being included in the classrooms in partnership with 'Classteacher.com'

During the 2020 lockdown due to COVID-19 pandemic in India, the school shut off its offline operations but conducted a virtual investiture ceremony of the prefectorial board of the 2020-21 batch.

Extra curricular

Sports Academy
There is a skating rink, cricket and football ground, tennis grounds, gymnasium, taekwondo rink, junior and senior department basketball courts aside from a swimming pool. There are evening classes for the sports academy. The students of the school have achieved significant positions in sports including table tennis, lawn tennis, skating, cricket, basketball, gymnastics, handball, golf, etc.

Hobbies and activities
In 2020, the school engaged in the Fit India Movement launched by PM Narendra Modi by observing a week-long program curated with yoga, traditional Indian games and sessions on maintaining a healthy lifestyle.

Controversy
A 16-year-old boy, Ankit, died after taking a plunge into a swimming pool in a Punjabi Bagh club in West Delhi on Tuesday, June 11, 2003. Apparently, there were four life guards and a supervisor present around the pool when Ankit drowned.

The victim was rushed to Agrasen hospital, where he was declared brought dead. According to deputy commissioner of police (licensing) G C Dwivedi, the club''s licence has been cancelled. "We won''t allow swimming in the club till the investigations are completed," said Dwivedi. The incident took place around 7.30 pm. Son of a businessman, Ankit was a student of Hansraj Model school and had passed his Class X examinations this year. He was a regular visitor of the club, the police said. Deputy Commissioner of police (west) Satish Golcha said: "The boy had gone to the pool alone. Five life guards were present on the spot. First-aid equipment was there as well." According to the police, four life guards are deployed in the evening and three in the morning at the pool, which is 16 feet deep. According to sources, there are more than 120 swimming pools in the city with a proper licence. But the actual number of swimming pools in the city is much more. The defaulter list included some educational institutions as well. The set of guidelines for maintaining a swimming pool is fairly comprehensive and stringent. Every pool must employ an instructor with adequate knowledge of first aid and artificial respiration. The instructor has to be present till the pool remains open.

During the COVID-19 pandemic, the school was involved in a fee-hike row with the Delhi Parents Association, where almost 288 Delhi schools were alleged to have increased their fees for the new academic session despite the announcement of a national lockdown.

Notable alumni
Sanjay Thapar, an ex-Wing Commander of the Indian Air Force and the first Indian to hoist the Tricolor at the North Pole was an alumnus of the school of the class of 1977.

Manika Batra, international tennis player and bronze-medalist at the 2018 Asian Games held in Jakarta is an alumnus of the school of the class of 2013.

2008 Beijing Olympic participant Neha Aggarwal, another table-tennis player also completed a part of her higher education from the school.

Indian stand-up comedian Amit Tandon also graduated from the school in the year 1993.

Indian television actresses Shraddha Arya and Aditi Sharma (actress, born 1996) are also graduates of Hansraj Model School.

References

External links
Official School Website

Schools in West Delhi
Schools in Delhi
Educational institutions established in 1966
1966 establishments in Delhi